The rusty-bellied shortwing (Brachypteryx hyperythra) is a species of bird in the family Muscicapidae.
It is found in Yunnan, Northeast India and far northern Myanmar.

Its natural habitats are subtropical or tropical moist lowland forests, subtropical or tropical moist montane forests, and subtropical or tropical moist shrubland. It is affected by habitat loss. Having turned out to be more common than previously believed, it is downlisted from Vulnerable to Near Threatened in the 2007 IUCN Red List.

References

 BirdLife International (2007a): [ 2006-2007 Red List status changes ]. Retrieved 2007-AUG-26.
 BirdLife International (2007b): Rusty-bellied Shortwing - BirdLife Species Factsheet. Retrieved 2007-AUG-28.

Further reading

External links
 Xeno-canto: audio recordings of the Rusty-bellied Shortwing

rusty-bellied shortwing
Birds of Northeast India
Birds of Yunnan
rusty-bellied shortwing
rusty-bellied shortwing
Taxonomy articles created by Polbot